Thunder in the Pines is a 1948 American Western film directed by Robert Edwards and starring George Reeves and Ralph Byrd. The film was shot in sepia tone. It was executive produced by Robert L. Lippert.

Production
Reeves and Byrd and producer William Stephens had just made Jungle Goddess for Lippert and were signed for this follow up, originally called Green Goddess. Filming started 15 August 1948. It was reported the film would be the first of 12 movies Stephens would make for Lippert "which is a hearty assignment for a moviemaker but apparently Stephens has a formula for production", according to the Los Angeles Times.

Filming started 15 August 1948. It was shot at Nassour Studios.

Inspired by Jungle Goddess, producer William Stephen announced he wanted to make four films a year starring Reeves and Byrd as a "Captain Flagg-Sgt Quinn sort of team", starting with this one. The second one would be Banana Boat by John Wilste. (Stephen was also going to make Three Alarm Fire by Arthur Caesar.) However conditions to film background scenes in South America, where Banana Fleet was set, were not ideal so instead Stephens made Hell on Wheels (which became Highway 13, also based on a story by Wilste).

Golden Gate Pictures announced they were going to make a film with Greg McClure called The Man from Back East produced by William David. That may have turned into this film.

References

External links

Thunder in the Pines at BFI

1948 films
American Western (genre) comedy films
Films directed by Robert Gordon
Films scored by Raoul Kraushaar
1940s Western (genre) comedy films
Films set in forests
Films about lumberjacks
Lippert Pictures films
American black-and-white films
1948 comedy films
1940s English-language films
1940s American films